Walker is a city in Cass County, Minnesota, United States. The population was 941 at the 2010 census. It is the county seat of Cass County.

Walker is part of the Brainerd Micropolitan Statistical Area.

Minnesota State Highways 34, 200, and 371 are three of the main routes in the city.

History

The area was inhabited for thousands of years by succeeding cultures of indigenous peoples. Before European settlement, the Ojibwe moved into the area from the Great Lakes, pushing out the historic Dakota peoples, such as the Assiniboine and Hidatsa. European American settlers followed the early fur traders and trappers, and encroached on Native American territories.

Following the construction of the railroad to the area, Patrick McGarry founded Walker in 1896. He named the settlement after the logging giant Thomas B. Walker, in hopes of luring construction of a sawmill. Walker instead chose to found and set up operations in nearby Akeley, because of his wife's moral objection to the bars and brothels in Walker, a rough frontier town. Walker developed with business, jobs and other services generated by four other logging companies.

Tourism later grew as a service industry. In the 20th century, people from urban areas came to more rural areas for recreation associated with lakes, fishing, hunting and water sports. The city reached its peak of population in 1950.

In 1907, Walker became the home of the Ah-Gwah-Ching Center, first constructed as a residential facility for tuberculosis (TB) patients, who at the time could be treated only with good nutrition and rest. By 1927, it had 300 patients. The facility had its own farm and dairy herd, the patients and staff put on skits and produced a newspaper, and it had its own railroad depot at one time. During the Great Depression, it was a site for display of art produced by artists paid by the WPA, and it had the state's largest WPA art collection. In 1962, the facility was adapted as a state nursing home for psychiatric patients. The complex is listed on the National Register of Historic Places. The building was closed in 2008.

Geography
Walker is on the southwest corner of Leech Lake, Minnesota's third-largest lake. Nearby cities and towns include Hackensack, Akeley, Whipholt, Laporte, Bemidji, and Onigum. Onigum is one of 11 communities that make up the Leech Lake Indian Reservation.

Climate
Walker has a humid continental climate (Köppen Dfb), with warm summers and cold, snowy winters.

Demographics

2010 census
As of the census of 2010, there were 941 people, 452 households, and 205 families living in the city. The racial makeup of the city was 88.0% White, 7.2% Native American, 1.1% Asian, 0.5% from other races, and 3.2% from two or more races. Hispanic or Latino of any race were 1.3% of the population.

There were 452 households, of which 21.2% had children under the age of 18 living with them, 33.4% were married couples living together, 8.4% had a female householder with no husband present, 3.5% had a male householder with no wife present, and 54.6% were non-families. 48.0% of all households were made up of individuals, and 23.4% had someone living alone who was 65 years of age or older. The average household size was 1.93 and the average family size was 2.82.

The median age in the city was 49 years. 19.2% of residents were under the age of 18; 5% were between the ages of 18 and 24; 20.9% were from 25 to 44; 24.9% were from 45 to 64; and 30.1% were 65 years of age or older. The gender makeup of the city was 44.5% male and 55.5% female.

2000 census
As of the census of 2000, there were 1,069 people, 449 households, and 258 families living in the city. The racial makeup of the city was 88.59% White, 0.09% African American, 8.98% Native American, 0.28% Asian, 0.28% from other races, and 1.78% from two or more races. Hispanic or Latino of any race were 1.03% of the population.

There were 449 households, out of which 24.7% had children under the age of 18 living with them, 43.7% were married couples living together, 10.0% had a female householder with no husband present, and 42.5% were non-families. 39.0% of all households were made up of individuals, and 22.5% had someone living alone who was 65 years of age or older.  The average household size was 2.16 and the average family size was 2.86.

In the city, the population was spread out, with 22.5% under the age of 18, 5.7% from 18 to 24, 26.1% from 25 to 44, 21.0% from 45 to 64, and 24.6% who were 65 years of age or older.  The median age was 42 years. For every 100 females, there were 92.3 males.  For every 100 females age 18 and over, there were 86.9 males.

The median income for a household in the city was $33,125, and the median income for a family was $44,063. Males had a median income of $31,324 versus $25,435 for females. The per capita income for the city was $17,079.  About 8.0% of families and 12.4% of the population were below the poverty line, including 15.3% of those under age 18 and 14.7% of those age 65 or over.

Education
Walker Public Schools are part of the Walker-Hackensack-Akeley School District. Schools in the district include Walker-Hackensack-Akeley Elementary School and Walker-Hackensack-Akeley High School (WHA). Brian Dietz is the Superintendent of Schools. The Walker-Hackensack-Akeley district was formed by the 1990 consolidation of the Walker and Akeley districts.

Walker is home to Walker-Hackensack-Akeley High School and Immanuel Lutheran School.

Media

TV stations
Walker is part of the Minneapolis / Saint Paul television market.

Newspaper
The Pilot Independent / Co-Pilot Shopper newspaper website

Radio stations
FM radio
88.5 Minnesota Public Radio (MPR)
90.1 KOJB The Eagle, Native American
92.5 KXKK
94.5 KDLB
97.5  KDKK
99.1  KLLZ-FM Z99 Classic Rock
101.9 KQKK
102.5 KKWB-FM
104.3 KLKS

AM radio
820  WBKK-AM
870  KPRM
1070 KSKK
1570 KAKK

Notable people
 Jimmy Darts, social media personality
 Mary Welsh Hemingway, journalist, wife of Ernest Hemingway
 Donald D. Lundrigan, Minnesota state representative and lawyer
 Noah W. Sawyer, Minnesota state representative
Ber (musician), Indie pop musician

References

External links

WalkerMN.com
Leech Lake Area Chamber of Commerce
Ancient Stone Tools Found; May Be Among Americas' Oldest. Stefan Lovgren for National Geographic News. February 15, 2007
History of Walker and Leech Lake
Leech Lake Ojibwe

Cities in Cass County, Minnesota
Cities in Minnesota
County seats in Minnesota
Brainerd, Minnesota micropolitan area
Leech Lake
1896 establishments in Minnesota